Dr. Ellen M. Umansky is the Carl and Dorothy Bennett Professor of Judaic Studies and Director of the Bennett Center for Judaic Studies at Fairfield University located in Fairfield, Connecticut, positions that she has held since 1994.

Before coming to Fairfield University, Dr. Umansky taught at various institutions, including Emory University (1982-1986, Asst. Prof. of Religion;1987-1990, Associate Prof. of Religion) Haverford College (Margaret Gest Visiting Associate Professor of Religion, 1990–1991), Vassar College (Visiting Associate Professor of Religion spring, 1992) and Hebrew Union College-Jewish Institute of Religion, NYC (Adjunct Assoc. Prof., 1990–1994).

The author of five books and almost one hundred scholarly articles and encyclopedia articles on modern Jewish history and religious thought and/or Jewish women's spirituality, she is the 2009 recipient of Fairfield University's Dr. Martin Luther King Jr. Faculty Vision Award for her “effort to instill and inspire the teachings and ideals” of Dr. King and the 2012 recipient of the Fairfield University Alumni Association's Distinguished Faculty/Administrator Award for her “inspired teaching and service” to the university. Past President of the Southern Jewish Historical Society and Chair of its Nominations Committee, she is a member of the Board of Directors of the Stimulus Foundation of Paulist Press, the Academic Advisory Board of the Jewish Women's Archive, and the Academic Council of the American Jewish Historical Society. She is a member of Phi Beta Kappa, Alpha Sigma Nu (the Jesuit Honor Society), and Theta Alpha Kappa (the national honors society in Religious studies and Theology).

Education

Dr. Umansky received her B.A. from Wellesley College; M.A. from the Yale Divinity School; and her M.Phil. and Ph.D. in religion from Columbia University in 1981.

Bibliography
Lily Montagu and the Advancement of Liberal Judaism: From Vision to Vocation (Studies in Women & Religion), (Edwin Mellen Press, December 1983)
Lily Montagu: Sermons, Addresses, Letters and Prayers, ed. (Edwin Mellen Press, 1985)
Four Centuries of Jewish Women's Spirituality: A Sourcebook, edited with D. Ashton (Beacon Press, 2004)
Four Centuries of Jewish Women's Spirituality: A Sourcebook, Revised Edition, edited and with introductions by Ellen M. Umansky and Dianne Ashton (Brandeis University Press, 2009)
From Christian Science to Jewish Science: Spiritual Healing and American Jews (Oxford University Press, USA, 2005)

References

External links
Carl & Dorothy Bennett Center for Judaic Studies

Living people
Yale Divinity School alumni
Columbia Graduate School of Arts and Sciences alumni
Vassar College faculty
Princeton University faculty
Hebrew Union College – Jewish Institute of Religion faculty
Fairfield University faculty
Judaic studies
Wellesley College alumni
Year of birth missing (living people)